Glenn Miller was a swing-era American jazz musician.

Glenn Miller may also refer to:

Frazier Glenn Miller, Jr. (1940–2021), commonly known as Glenn Miller, white nationalist, perennial candidate, and convicted murderer
Glenn M. Wise (1896–1991), née Glenn Miller, first woman to serve as Secretary of State of Wisconsin
Glenn Miller (rugby league), Australian rugby league player

Glen Miller may refer to:
Glen Miller (basketball) (born 1963), formerly of University of Pennsylvania and Brown University
A small unincorporated village in Quinte West, Ontario, Canada

See also
Glenn Miller (album), a 1945 album by Glenn Miller and His Orchestra
The Glenn Miller Story, a 1954 film about jazz musician Glenn Miller's life